CAV3 may refer to:
 CAV3 (gene)
 100 Mile House Airport's Transport Canada location identifier

See also
 Third Cavalry (disambiguation)